Lin Tsung-yi (Taiwanese: Lîm Chong-gī, ; 19 September 1920 – 20 July 2010) was an academic and educator in psychiatry.

Lin was born in 1920 in Tainan Prefecture, Japanese Taiwan (modern-day Tainan, Taiwan) to Lin Mosei and Chai-Hwang Wang. Like his parents, he studied in Japan, graduating from the School of Medicine at Tokyo Imperial University (now University of Tokyo) in 1943. He did postgraduate training at Harvard Medical School and the Institute of Psychiatry at Maudsley Hospital.

Lin was Honorary President of the World Federation for Mental Health.  He was a director of the psychiatric department and an adviser of psychiatric studies at the World Health Organization.

He held professorships in psychiatry at the National Taiwan University, University of Michigan, University of British Columbia. His father, Lin Mosei, was an educator and a victim of the February 28 Incident in Taiwan. In late 1980s, Lin was one of the initiators of the February 28 Incident Peace and Justice Movement.

Publications

References

1920 births
Writers from Tainan
Taiwanese psychiatrists
2010 deaths
University of Tokyo alumni
Psychiatry academics
University of Michigan faculty
Academic staff of the National Taiwan University
Academic staff of the University of British Columbia
Taiwanese expatriates in Japan
Taiwanese expatriates in the United States
Taiwanese expatriates in Canada